Mount Olive is a town in Covington County, Mississippi, United States. The population was 895 at the 2020 census.

History
The town of Mount Olive was incorporated on May 18, 1900, making the town older than Magee to the north and older than Collins to the south. The railroad tracks were completed in 1899. The population of Mount Olive in 2016 was 975.

Geography
Mississippi Highway 35 passes through the southern end of town and leads northeast  to Mize and southwest  to Columbia.

It is in the valley of Okatoma Creek, part of the Pascagoula River watershed.

Demographics

As of the 2020 United States census, there were 895 people, 589 households, and 492 families residing in the town.

As of the census of 2000, there were 893 people, 348 households, and 239 families residing in the town. The population density was 738.5 people per square mile (284.9/km). There were 396 housing units at an average density of 327.5 per square mile (126.4/km). The racial makeup of the town was 46.81% White, 51.96% African American, 0.11% Pacific Islander, and 1.12% from two or more races. Hispanic or Latino of any race were 0.56% of the population.

There were 348 households, out of which 33.3% had children under the age of 18 living with them, 37.4% were married couples living together, 25.0% had a female householder with no husband present, and 31.3% were non-families. 30.5% of all households were made up of individuals, and 14.1% had someone living alone who was 65 years of age or older. The average household size was 2.57 and the average family size was 3.19.

In the town, the population was spread out, with 30.5% under the age of 18, 8.5% from 18 to 24, 25.3% from 25 to 44, 21.8% from 45 to 64, and 13.9% who were 65 years of age or older. The median age was 35 years. For every 100 females, there were 83.7 males. For every 100 females age 18 and over, there were 76.4 males.

The median income for a household in the town was $22,019, and the median income for a family was $26,146. Males had a median income of $26,250 versus $16,719 for females. The per capita income for the town was $11,008. About 26.9% of families and 34.2% of the population were below the poverty line, including 47.4% of those under age 18 and 24.6% of those age 65 or over.

Education
The town of Mount Olive is served by the Covington County School District. It is served by Mount Olive Elementary School and Mount Olive High School.

Notable people
Rose Bascom (1922-1993), trick roper, trick rider, Hollywood movie actress, Mississippi Rodeo Hall of Fame inductee
Howard Easterling, Negro league baseball third baseman
W. Ralph Eubanks, author, journalist, professor
Fred McNair, former professional football quarterback and head coach of Alcorn State and the brother of Steve McNair
Steve McNair (1973-2009), All-Pro quarterback for the Tennessee Titans
Hannah Roberts, Miss Mississippi 2015, 1st runner-up to Miss America 2016

References

External links
Town of Mount Olive official website

Towns in Covington County, Mississippi
Towns in Mississippi